Near North can refer to:

Near North, Minneapolis, a community in Minneapolis, Minnesota, U.S.
Near North (neighborhood), Minneapolis, a neighborhood within the community
Norte Chico, Chile, a region in Chile sometimes translated as Near North
A term for the Far East used in Australia
A cultural and economic region of Canada, roughly similar to the Boreal forest ecological region

See also
Near North Side (disambiguation)